Tancredo may refer to:
Tancredo Neves (1910–1985), Brazilian statesman
Tancredo Pinochet (1879–1957), Chilean intellectual
Tom Tancredo (born 1945), American politician

See also 
Don Tancredo,  a bullfighting technique
Tancred
Tancredi (disambiguation)

Masculine given names